is a Prefectural Natural Park in Ehime Prefecture, Japan. Established in 1962, the park spans the borders of the municipalities of Imabari and Matsuyama.

See also
 National Parks of Japan
 Dōgo Onsen
 Tamagawa, Ehime

References

External links
  Detailed map of Okudōgo Tamagawa Prefectural Natural Park

Parks and gardens in Ehime Prefecture
Imabari, Ehime
Matsuyama, Ehime
Protected areas established in 1962
1962 establishments in Japan